Coahoma County Junior-Senior High School (CCJSHS) is a public junior and senior high school within the city limits of Clarksdale, Mississippi. It is a part of the Coahoma County School District.

The district serves the Coahoma County towns of Coahoma, Friars Point, Jonestown, Lula, and Lyon as well as the unincorporated community of Sherard and all other unincorporated areas; it does not serve areas within the City of Clarksdale.

History
Around the time of racial integration, circa the 1960s, there had been plans to build a new consolidated Clarksdale-Coahoma County High School to serve all children in Coahoma County; plans were abandoned, even though the building was already constructed because the officials wanted to maintain segregation in a de facto manner.

Many members of the American football team at the school transferred to Lee Academy as integration via court order was about to occur.

See also
Clarksdale High School
Coahoma Agricultural High School

References

External links
 Coahoma County Junior-Senior High School

Schools in Coahoma County, Mississippi
Public high schools in Mississippi
Public middle schools in Mississippi
Clarksdale, Mississippi